Karim Essediri (born 29 July 1979) is a former professional footballer who played as a right winger. Born in France, he earned eight caps with the Tunisia national team at international level.

Career
Essediri was born in Paris. Before joining Lillestrøm in 2006, he played for Rosenborg, Bodø/Glimt and Tromsø in Norway, Club Meaux and Red Star 93 in France, and Club Africain in Tunisia.

Essediri experienced a tough start at Tromsø, and was given partial blame for the club's 2001 relegation. The following year he was lent out to another Norwegian club Bodø/Glimt. When he returned to Tromsø, he was not considered first-team material. However, the arrival of Per Mathias Høgmo as head coach made Essediri the starting right winger in Høgmo's counterattacking style of play. Essediri's pace made him an important figure in setting up Tromsø I.L.'s counterattacks, and he ended the 2004 season being among the top three for assists in the Premier League. Essediri had successfully turned from scapegoat in 2001 to hero in 2004.

Following his success at Tromsø, Essediri was picked for several matches for Tunisia, both in the World Cup 2006, and the 2005 Confederations Cup.

Having struggled to break into the Lillestrøm side, the 2009 season has seen Essediri convert to right back with success, and was a regular during the 2009-season.

Career statistics

References

External links

Citizens of Tunisia through descent
Tunisian footballers
Tunisia international footballers
2005 FIFA Confederations Cup players
2006 FIFA World Cup players
French sportspeople of Tunisian descent
1979 births
Living people
Tromsø IL players
Rosenborg BK players
FK Bodø/Glimt players
Lillestrøm SK players
Club Africain players
Expatriate footballers in Norway
Eliteserien players
Association football defenders